World of Jenks is an American documentary television series on MTV. The series premiered on September 13, 2010 following the 2010 MTV Video Music Awards. The second season of the series debuted on March 4, 2013 and consists of ten one-hour episodes.

Background
The series stars Andrew Jenks and showcases the lives of inspirational young people from various locations of the United States. Jenks moves in with a different stranger for a week to experience their life from their perspective.

Episodes

Series overview

Season 1 (2010)

Season 2 (2013)

References

External links

2010s American documentary television series
2010 American television series debuts
English-language television shows
MTV original programming